So Lucky is the seventh studio album by Australian musician Renée Geyer. The album was released in November 1981 and includes Geyer's highest charting single "Say I Love You" which peaked at number 5 in Australia and number 1 in New Zealand.

The album was released by Portrait Records in the United States of America in 1982 under the title Reneé Geyer. The songs were re-ordered. It was her second album released in that territory following the Polydor Records' Moving Along in 1977, which was also titled Reneé Geyer.

Track listing
Vinyl/ cassette (L 37554)
Side One
 "Do You Know What I Mean" (Lee Michaels) - 3.20
 "Baby I've Been Missing You" (Chuck Jackson, Marvin Yancy) - 3.36 
 "Say I Love You" (Eddy Grant) - 3.33
 "Come On" (Chuck Berry) - 2.39
 "You Don't Know Nothing About Love" (Jerry Ragovoy) - 3.56
Side Two
 "I Can Feel the Fire" (Ron Wood) - 4.15 
 "Good Lovin'" (Renée Geyer, Ricky Fataar, Ian McLaglan, Johnny Lee Schell, Ray O'Hara) - 3.36
 "Everything Good is Bad" (Norman Johnson, Angelo Bond, Greg Perry) - 4.21
 "So Lucky" (Renée Geyer, Ricky Fataar) - 3.42
 "On Your Way Down"  (Allen Toussaint) - 5.41

Personnel
Renée Geyer –  vocals, backing vocals
Johnny Lee Schell –  guitars, piano, vocals
Ian McLaglan –  keyboards, vocals
Ray O'Hara –  bass guitar, vocals
Ricky Fataar –  drums, percussion, vocals, keyboards
William Smith - organ, vocals
Geoff Hales - percussion
Bobby Keys - saxophone, vocals
Blondie Chaplin - vocals
James Ingram - vocals 
Venetta Fields - vocals

Charts

References

1981 albums
Renée Geyer albums
albums produced by Rob Fraboni
Mushroom Records albums
Portrait Records albums
Albums recorded at Shangri-La (recording studio)
Post-disco albums
Synth-pop albums by Australian artists